Following is a list of Indian male actors who have worked in Hindi cinema, the commercial Hindi-language film industry based chiefly in Mumbai. For actresses please see List of Hindi film actresses

Actors are listed alphabetically by given name.

A

 A. K. Hangal
 Aamir Bashir
 Aamir Khan
 Aanjjan Srivastav
 Aasif Sheikh
 Abhi Bhattacharya
 Abhijeet Sawant
 Abhinav Shukla
 Abhishek Bachchan
 Abhay Deol
 Abhay Shukla
 Achyut Potdar
 Adi Irani
 Adil Hussain
 Aditya Kumar
 Aditya Lakhia
 Aditya Roy Kapur
 Aditya Seal
 Aditya Shrivastava
 Aftab Shivdasani
 Agha
 Ahan Shetty
 Ajay Devgan
 Ajay Nagrath
 Ajit
 Ajith Kumar
 Ajinkya Deo
 Akash Khurana
 Akbar Khan
 Akhilendra Mishra
 Akshay Anand
 Akshay Kumar
 Akshaye Khanna
 Ali Asgar
 Ali Fazal 
 Alok Nath
 Aman Verma
 Amar Upadhyay
 Amit Mistry 
 Amit Sadh
 Amit Varma
 Amitabh Bachchan
 Amjad Khan
 Amol Palekar
 Amrinder Gill
 Amrish Puri
 Amrit Pal
 Anand Abhyankar
 Anand Tiwari
 Anant Jog
 Anant Mahadevan
 Anant Nag
 Anang Desai
 Angad Bedi
 Anil Kapoor
 Anil Dhawan
 Aniruddh Dave
 Ankit Mohan
 Ankit Gupta
 Ankush Hazra
 Annu Kapoor
 Anoop Kumar 
 Anup Soni
 Anup Upadhyay
 Anupam Kher
 Anwar Hussain
 Aparshakti Khurana
 Apurva Agnihotri
 Arbaaz Khan
 Arfi Lamba
 Arif Zakaria
 Arjun
 Arjun Kapoor
 Arjun Rampal
 Armaan Kohli
 Arshad Warsi
 Arun Bakshi
 Arun Bali
 Arun Govil
 Arunoday Singh
 Arya Babbar
 Aryan Vaid
 Arvind Trivedi
 Aseem Merchant
 Ashish Vidyarthi
 Ashmit Patel
 Ashok Banthia
 Ashok Kumar 
 Ashok Saraf
 Ashutosh Gowariker
 Ashutosh Rana
 Asif Basra 
 Asit Sen
 Asrani
 Atul Agnihotri
 Atul Kulkarni
 Avinash Tiwary
 Avinash Wadhawan
 Avtar Gill
 Ayub Khan
 Ayushmann Khurrana

B

 Baba Sehgal
 Baburaj
 Bal Dhuri
 Balraj Sahni
 Barun Sobti
 Benjamin Gilani
 Bhagwan Dada
 Bharat Bhushan
 Bharat Kapoor
 Bhushan Tiwari
 Biswajit Chatterjee
 Bob Christo
 Bobby Deol
 Boloram Das
 Boman Irani
 Brijendrapal Singh

C

 Chaman Puri
 Chandra Mohan
 Chandrachur Singh
 Chandrashekhar Dubey 
 Chandrashekhar Vaidya
 Charuhasan
 Chetan Hansraj
 Chiranjeevi
 Chunky Pandey

D

 Dalip Tahil
 Dan Dhanoa
 Danny Denzongpa
 Dara Singh
 Darshan Jariwala
 Darshan Kumar
 Darsheel Safary
 David Abraham Cheulkar
 Daya Shankar Pandey
 Dayanand Shetty
 Deb Mukherjee
 Deep Dhillon
 Deepak Dobriyal
 Deepak Jethi
 Deepak Parashar
 Deepak Shirke
 Deepak Tijori
 Dev Anand
 Deven Bhojani
 Deven Verma
 Dharmendra
 Dharmesh Yelande
 Dheer Charan Srivastav 
 Dheeraj Kumar
 Dhritiman Chatterjee
 Dhumal
 Dilip Dhawan 
 Dilip Joshi
 Dilip Kumar
 Dilip Prabhavalkar
 Diljit Dosanjh
 Dinesh Hingoo
 Dinesh Kaushik
 Dinesh Phadnis
 Dino Morea
 Dinyar Contractor
 Divyendu Sharma
 Diwakar Pundir
 Dulquer Salmaan

E

 Edward Sonnenblick
 Emraan Hashmi

F

 Fahmaan Khan
 Faisal Khan
 Faraaz Khan
 Fardeen Khan
 Farhan Akhtar
 Farooq Sheikh
 Feroz Khan
 Firoz Irani

G 

 Gajanan Jagirdar 
 Gajendra Chauhan
 Gajraj Rao
 Ganesh Acharya
 Gavin Packard
 Ghanashyam Nayak
 Gippy Grewal
 Gireesh Sahdev
 Giriraj Kabra
 Girish Karnad
 Girish Kumar
 Goga Kapoor
 Gope
 Gopi Krishna
 Govind Namdev
 Govinda
 Gufi Paintal
 Gulshan Grover
 Gurmeet Choudhary
 Guru Dutt

H

 Hari Shivdasani
 Harindranath Chattopadhyay
 Harish Kumar
 Harish Patel
 Harshad Chopda
 Harman Baweja
 Harsh Chhaya
 Harshvardhan Kapoor
 Harshvardhan Rane
 Hemant Birje
 Hemant Pandey
 Himansh Kohli
 Himanshu Malik
 Himesh Reshammiya
 Hiten Paintal
 Hiten Kumar
 Honey Singh
 Hrithik Roshan
 Hrishikesh Pandey

I

 I. S. Johar
 Iftekhar
 Imran Khan
 Irrfan Khan
 Inaamulhaq
 Inder Kumar
 Indraneil Sengupta
 Ishaan Khatter

J

 Jack Gaud
 Jackie Shroff
 Jackky Bhagnani
 Jagdeep
 Jagdish Raj
 Jaideep Ahlawat
 Jamnadas Majethia
 Jankidas
 Jas Arora
 Jassie Gill
 Jatin Sarna 
 Javed Jaffrey
 Javed Khan
 Javed Khan Amrohi
 Jay Bhanushali
 Jay Mehta
 Jayant Kripalani
 Jeetendra
 Jeevan
 Joginder
 Jim Sarbh
 Jimmy Shergill
 Jisshu Sengupta
 Jitendra Kumar
 John Abraham
 Johnny Lever
 Johnny Walker
 Joy Mukherjee
 Jugal Hansraj

K

 Kabir Bedi
 Kader Khan
 Kamaal R. Khan
 Kamal Haasan
 Kamal Kapoor
 Kanhaiyalal
 Kanwaljit Singh
 Kapil Sharma
 Karan Grover
 Karan Johar
 Karan Kapoor
 Karan Kundrra
 Karan Patel
 Karan Singh Grover
 Karan Wahi
 Karanvir Bohra
 Karmveer Choudhary
 Kartik Aaryan
 Kay Kay Menon
 Keshto Mukherjee
 Kharaj Mukherjee
 Kiran Kumar
 Kishore Kumar
 K. K. Goswami
 K. K. Raina
 K. L. Saigal
 K. N. Singh
 Krishan Dhawan
  Krishna Bharadwaj
 Krishan Kumar
 Kuku Kohli
 Kulbhushan Kharbanda
 Kumar Gaurav
 Kumud Mishra
 Kunal Goswami
 Kunal Kapoor
 Kunal Kapoor
 Kunal Khemu
 Kushal Punjabi

L

 Lakha Lakhwinder Singh
 Lalit Tiwari
 Laxmikant Berde
 Lilliput

M

 M. K. Raina
 Mac Mohan
 Madan Jain
 Madan Puri
 Madhukar Toradmal
 Mahavir Shah 
 Mahendra Sandhu
 Mahesh Anand
 Mahesh Manjrekar
 Mahipal
 Mamik Singh
 Mammootty
 Manav Gohil
 Manav Kaul
 Manav Vij
 Mangal Dhillon
 Manik Irani
 Maninder Singh
 Manish Chaudhari
 Manish Malhotra 
 Manish Paul
 Manjot Singh
 Manmohan
 Manmohan Krishna
 Manohar Singh
 Manoj Bajpayee
 Manoj Joshi
 Manoj Kumar
 Manoj Pahwa
 Manoj Tiger
 Manoj Tiwari
 Moolchand
 Marc Zuber
 Mazhar Khan
 Mehmood
 Meiyang Chang
 Milind Gawali
 Milind Gunaji
 Milind Soman
 Mithun Chakraborty
 Mohammed Zeeshan Ayyub
 Mohan Agashe
 Mohan Choti
 Mohan Gokhale
 Mohan Joshi
 Mohan Kapur
 Mohanlal
 Mohan Raman
 Mohit Ahlawat
 Mohit Chadda
 Mohit Marwah 
 Mohit Raina
 Mohnish Bahl
 Mohsin Khan
 Motilal
 Mudasir Zafar
 Mukesh Batra
 Mukesh Khanna
 Mukesh Rawal
 Mukesh Rishi
 Mukesh Tiwari
 Mukri
 Mukul Chadda
 Mukul Dev
 Mulraj Rajda
 Murad
 Murali Sharma

N

 Naga Chaitanya
 Nagarjuna
 Nana Palshikar
 Nana Patekar
 Narendra Nath
 Naresh Kanodia 
 Naseeruddin Shah
 Nassar
 Naved Aslam
 Naveen Polishetty
 Navin Nischol
 Nawazuddin Siddiqui
 Nazir Hussain
 Nazir Kashmiri
 Neeraj Vora
 Neil Nitin Mukesh
 Nikesh Ram
 Nikkhil Advani
 Nilu Phule
 Nimai Bali
 Ninad Kamat
 Nirmal Pandey
 Nitish Bharadwaj

O

 Om Katare
 Om Prakash
 Om Puri
 Om Shivpuri
 Omi Vaidya

P

 Paidi Jairaj
 Paintal
 Pankaj Berry
 Pankaj Dheer
 Pankaj Kapoor
 Pankaj Tripathi
 Parambrata Chatterjee
 Paresh Ganatra
 Paresh Rawal
 Parikshat Sahni
 Parmeet Sethi
 Pavan Malhotra
 Piyush Mishra
 Prabhas
 Prabhu Deva
 Pradeep Kumar
 Pradeep Rawat
 Prakash Raj
 Pran
 Prateik Babbar
 Pratik Gandhi
 Praveen Kumar
 Prem Chopra
 Prem Kishen
 Prem Nath
 Prithviraj Kapoor
 Prithviraj Sukumaran
 Priyanshu Chatterjee
 Priyanshu Painyuli
 Pramod Chakravorty 
 Prosenjit Chatterjee
 Pulkit Samrat
 Puneet Issar
 Punit Pathak

R

 R. Madhavan
 Raaj Kumar
 Raghubir Yadav
 Rahil Azam
 Rahul Bose
 Rahul Dev
 Rahul Kumar
 Rahul Roy
 Rahul Singh
 Raj Arjun
 Raj Babbar
 Raj Kapoor
 Raj Kiran
 Raj Kishore
 Raj Mehra
 Raj Zutshi
 Raja Bundela
 Rajan Sippy
 Rajat Bedi
 Rajat Kapoor
 Rajeev Khandelwal
 Rajeev Mehta
 Rajendra Gupta
 Rajendra Kumar
 Rajendra Nath
 Rajendranath Zutshi
 Rajesh Khanna
 Rajesh Khattar
 Rajesh Khera
 Rajesh Puri
 Rajesh Sharma
 Rajesh Vivek
 Rajinikanth
 Rajit Kapur
 Rajkummar Rao
 Rajneesh Duggal
 Rajpal Yadav
 Raju Kher
 Raju Srivastav
 Rakesh Bapat
 Rakesh Bedi
 Rakesh Roshan
 Ramayan Tiwari
 Ram Charan
 Ram Kapoor
 Ramkumar Bohra
 Ramesh Deo
 Ramesh Mehta
 Rami Reddy
 Rana Daggubati
 Ranbir Kapoor
 Randeep Hooda
 Randhir
 Randhir Kapoor
 Ranjan
 Ranjeet
 Ranveer Singh
 Ranvir Shorey
 Rashid Khan
 Rasik Dave
 Ravi Kale
 Ravi Kishan
 Raza Murad
 Razzak Khan
 Rehman
 Rishabh Shukla 
 Rishi Kapoor
 Riteish Deshmukh
 Rohan Mehra
 Rohit Roy
 Rohit Saraf
 Rohitash Gaud
 Romesh Sharma
 Ronit Roy
 Roopesh Kumar

S

 Saanand Verma
 Sabyasachi Chakraborty
 Sachin Khedekar
 Sachin Pilgaonkar 
 Sachin Shroff
 Sadashiv Amrapurkar
 Saeed Jaffrey
 Sahil Khan
 Saif Ali Khan
 Salim Ghouse
 Salim Khan
 Salman Khan
 Salman Yusuff Khan
 Sameer Dharmadhikari
 Sanjay Dutt
 Sanjay Kapoor
 Sanjay Khan
 Sanjay Mishra
 Sanjay Suri
 Sanjeev Kumar
 Sanjeev Tyagi
 Sapru
 Sarath Babu
 Sarfaraz Khan
 Satish Kaul
 Satish Kaushik
 Satish Shah
 Satyen Kappu
 Saurabh Shukla
 Sayaji Shinde
 Shaan
 Shadaab Khan
 Shafi Inamdar
 Shah Rukh Khan
 Shahbaz Khan
 Shahid Kapoor
 Shaheer Sheikh
 Shakti Kapoor
 Shammi Kapoor
 Shankar Nag
 Sharad Kapoor
 Sharad Kelkar
 Sharat Saxena
 Sharman Joshi
 Shashi Kapoor
 Shatrughan Sinha
 Shavinder Mahal
 Sheikh Mukhtar
 Shiney Ahuja
 Shishir Sharma
 Shiva Rindani
 Shivaji Satam
 Shreyas Talpade
 Shriram Lagoo
 Shrivallabh Vyas
 Shyam
 Sid Makkar
 Siddhant Chaturvedi
 Siddharth
 Siddharth Ray
 Sidhant Gupta
 Sidharth Malhotra
 Sidharth Shukla
 Sikandar Kher
 Snehlata
 Sohail Khan
 Sonu Sood
 Sooraj Pancholi
 Subrat Dutta
 Sudeep
 Sudesh Berry
 Sudipto Balav
 Sudhanshu Pandey
 Sudhir
 Sudhir Dalvi
 Sudhir Pandey
 Sujit Kumar
 Sumeet Vyas
 Sumeet Raghavan
 Sunder
 Suniel Shetty
 Sunil Dutt
 Sunil Grover
 Sunil Lahri
 Sunil Pal
 Sunny Deol
 Sunny Kaushal
 Supriyo Dutta
 Surendra
 Surendra Pal
 Suresh
 Suresh Chatwal
 Suresh Oberoi
 Suriya
 Sushant Singh
 Sushant Singh Rajput
 Swapnil Joshi

T

 Tahir Raj Bhasin
 Tariq
 Tarun Bose
 Tarun Khanna
 Tej Sapru
 Thakur Anoop Singh
 Tiger Shroff
 Tiku Talsania
 Tinnu Anand
 Tom Alter
 Tota Roy Chowdhury
 Trilok Kapoor
 Tushar Dalvi
 Tusshar Kapoor

U

 Uday Chopra 
 Uday Sabnis
 Upen Patel
 Upendra Limaye
 Upendra Trivedi
 Utpal Dutt
 Uttam Kumar

V

 V K Sharma
 Vaquar Shaikh
 Varun Badola
 Varun Dhawan
 Varun Sharma
 Vicky Kaushal
 Victor Banerjee
 Vidyut Jammwal
 Vijay
   Vijay Anand
 Vijay Arora
 Vijay Raaz
 Vijay Varma
 Vijayendra Ghatge
 Viju Khote
 Vikas Anand
 Vikrant Massey
 Vinay Anand
 Vinay Pathak
 Vineet Kumar
 Vineet Raina
 Vinod Kapoor
 Vinod Khanna
 Vinod Mehra
 Virendra Razdan
 Virendra Saxena 
 Vishal Kotian
 Vishwajeet Pradhan
 Vivan Bhatena
 Vivek Mushran 
 Vivek Oberoi

W

 Waris Ahluwalia

Y

 Yakub
 Yash Pandit
 Yash Tonk
 Yashpal Sharma
 Yatin Karyekar
 Yunus Parvez
 Yusuf Khan

Z

 
 Zakir Hussain
 Zayed Khan
 Zubeen Garg
 Zulfi Syed

See also
 List of Indian film actors
 List of Indian film actresses
 List of Hindi film actresses
 List of Indian television actors
 Lists of actors

External links
 Bollywood Celebs List on Bollywood Hungama

Hindi cinema